The 2002 FINA Diving World Cup was held in Seville, Spain.

Medal winners

Men

Women

References
 "FINA Diving World Cup Medalist"

External links
 www.fina.org/

FINA Diving World Cup
Fina Diving World Cup
Fina Diving World Cup
Sports competitions in Seville
International aquatics competitions hosted by Spain
Diving competitions in Spain
21st century in Seville